Radio Velika Kladuša is a Bosnian local public radio station, broadcasting from Velika Kladuša, Bosnia and Herzegovina.

Radio Velika Kladuša was launched on 2 February 2001 by the Municipal council of Velika Kladuša. This radio station broadcasts a variety of programs such as music, sport, local news and talk shows. Program is mainly produced in Bosnian language and it is available in Una-Sana Canton, Bosanska Krajina area and in neighboring Croatia.

Estimated number of potential listeners of Radio Velika Kladuša is around 30,439.

Frequencies
The program is currently broadcast at one frequency:
 Velika Kladuša

See also 
 List of radio stations in Bosnia and Herzegovina
 Radio Bihać
 Radio Cazin
 Radio USK
 Radio Velkaton
 Trend Radio

References

External links 
 www.radiovkladusa.ba
 Communications Regulatory Agency of Bosnia and Herzegovina

Velika Kladuša
Radio stations established in 2001

Mass media in Velika Kladuša